The 2012 Washington Attorney General election was held on November 6, 2012, concurrently with the other statewide elections and the gubernatorial election. Incumbent Republican State Attorney General Rob McKenna retired to run for governor. Democratic King County Councilmember Bob Ferguson won the general election over Republican King County Councilmember Reagan Dunn.

Primary election

Democratic candidates
Bob Ferguson, King County Councilmember

Republican candidates
Reagan Dunn, King County Councilmember
Stephen Pidgeon, attorney and anti-gay activist

Results

General election

Polling
Graphical summary

Results

References

2012 Washington (state) elections
2012
Washington